Junction is an unincorporated community in Lemhi County, in the U.S. state of Idaho.

History
Bannock had its start when A. M. Stephenson established a hotel at the site. The community was so named from its location at the junction of Bannock pass road and the Mormon road. A post office called Junction was established in 1874, and remained in operation until 1919.

References

Unincorporated communities in Lemhi County, Idaho
Unincorporated communities in Idaho